Agop Jack Hacikyan (25 November 1931 – 3 July 2015) was a Canadian university Emeritus Professor of Literary Studies, historian, academic and writer. He was born in Istanbul, Turkey in 1931. He is the author of over 30 books on literature and linguistics, and eight novels, including A Summer Without Dawn, an international bestseller. He is known as the co-author of one of the most comprehensive anthologies of Armenian literature, The Heritage of Armenian Literature: From the Eighteenth Century to Modern Times (Wayne State University Press, 2005).

Hacikyan was born in Istanbul to Armenian parents. After completing the first year of his engineering degree, Hacikyan left Turkey to study literature. He received his PhD in Montreal and has lived in Quebec since 1957.

Novels
The Young Man in the Grey Suit (2013)
My Ethnic Quest (2012)
The Lamppost Diary (2009)
Les rives du destin (2005)
A Summer Without Dawn (2000)
Un été sans aube (1991)
The Battle of the Prophets (1981)
Tomas (1970)

References

External links
The Heritage of Armenian Literature

Canadian male novelists
Turkish emigrants to Canada
Academic staff of the Royal Military College Saint-Jean
2015 deaths
1931 births
Canadian people of Armenian descent
Writers from Istanbul
Turkish people of Armenian descent
20th-century Canadian novelists
21st-century Canadian novelists